Sphephelo Mayaba (born 31 May 1987) is a South African rugby union player, currently playing for KwaZulu-Natal club side College Rovers.

References

South African rugby union players
Eastern Province Elephants players
Living people
1987 births
Rugby union props
Rugby union players from Pietermaritzburg